The following ships are named Queen Mary:

 , a battlecruiser of the Royal Navy launched in 1912 and sunk at the Battle of Jutland in 1916
 , a Clyde steamer launched in 1933, now retired and currently under restoration on the River Clyde in Scotland, United Kingdom
 , a Cunard Line ocean liner launched in 1936, now retired as a hotel in Long Beach, California, United States
 , a Cunard ocean liner that entered service in 2003

Ship names